Nematotaeniidae is a family of tapeworms which includes the Baerietta genus.

References 

Cestoda
Platyhelminthes families